Cilla Kung also known as Lok Tung (樂瞳), birth name is Gung Sin-tung (龔茜彤), born in 1986, is a former Hong Kong actress, singer, model, and current businesswoman. She started out as a contestant in Beautiful Cooking. She gained recognition in The Four, and Yes, Sir. Sorry, Sir!.

On 14 June 2017, her 10 year contract with TVB ended and she did not renew her contract. Her final appearance for TVB was in the upcoming drama, The Forgotten Valley. She cited that she wanted to leave and try working with other companies and that she had a hard time deciding whether she wanted to leave TVB, as she had a lot of ups and downs in TVB. As of 2020, Kung has become a businesswoman and started a wine business.

TV series

Films 
 A Beautiful Moment (2018)
 Hardcore Comedy (2013)
 I Love Hong Kong 2012 (2012)
 I Love Hong Kong (2011)
 The Jade and The Pearl (2010)

Music video appearances
2007: "你我她" by Vincy Chan
2007: "愛一個上一課" by Joey Yung
2007: "Here I Go" by Eric Suen

Awards
Next TV Awards 2012-Most Promising Female Artist

References

External links
Official Blog

TVB actors
Living people
1986 births